NYCRUNS, sometimes styled NYCRuns and formally New York City Runs, Inc. is a New York City race organizer founded by Steve Lastoe that produces races throughout the five boroughs. They average three dozen races that serve 50,000 runners each year.

Among their most well known are the Empire State Building Run-Up and the Brooklyn Marathon. From 2011-2016 they produced the Yonkers Marathon, the second oldest in the United States. In August 2020, they hosted New York City's first in-person race following the COVID-19 shutdown.

References

External links

Organizations based in Brooklyn
Road running in the United States
Running in New York City
Running clubs in the United States